5,10-Methenyltetrahydrofolate synthetase deficiency (MTHFS deficiency) is a rare neurodevelopmental disorder caused by mutations affecting the MTHFS gene, which encodes the enzyme 5,10-Methenyltetrahydrofolate synthetase.

The disease starts at birth or in early infancy and presents with microcephaly, short stature, and developmental delay. Patients develop seizures that may be hard to control. Brain imaging shows delayed myelination and hypomyelination. Mutations of the MTHFS gene disrupt folate metabolism, which is very important for the proper development of the nervous system and myelination of nerve fibers.

Patients present with cerebral folate deficiency, a condition in which there are reduced levels of 5-MTHF in the cerebrospinal fluid. However, contrary to other causes of cerebral folate deficiency, the use of folinic acid for treatment may be contraindicated due to excess levels of folinic acid in the organism of patients.

The first case report of MTHFS deficiency was published in 2018.

See also
 Cerebral folate deficiency

References

Neurodevelopmental disorders